Arthur Ray Perkins (born May 1, 1940) was an American football fullback who played college football for North Texas State and professional football for the Los Angeles Rams (1962–1963), Winnipeg Blue Bombers (1964–1966), and Edmonton Eskimos (1967–1969).

Early years
A native of Fort Worth, Texas, he attended Dunbar High School in that city. He played football, basketball, baseball, and competed in the shot put at Dunbar High. He then played college football at North Texas State in Denton, Texas. In 1958, Perkins and Billy Christie became the first African-American athletes to integrate North Texas State on four-year athletic scholarships.  He was known by the nickname "Pearly".

Professional football
He was drafted by the Los Angeles Rams with the 44th pick in the 1962 NFL Draft. He played for the Rams during the 1962 and 1963 sesons, appearing in 26 NFL games. In his second year with the Rams, he was used principally as a blocking back.

He later played in the Canadian Football League for the Winnipeg Blue Bombers (1964–1966), and Edmonton Eskimos (1967–1969). He appeared in 74 CFL games, tallying 2,961 yards, 1,386 receiving yards, and scoring 29 touchdowns. He was known as an excellent receiver who rarely missed a pass, catching 18 of 18 one year and 37 of 37 another.

References

1940 births
Living people
American football fullbacks
Los Angeles Rams players
North Texas Mean Green football players
Players of American football from Fort Worth, Texas